Eni Koçi (born 5 July 1996), is an Albanian singer and songwriter.

Life 
Eni Koçi was born on 5 July 1996 in Berat, Albania. She is the younger sister of Greta Koçi.

Career 
She started with music at the age of 7 and gave her first results at the age of 10, where she won the second prize at the National Festival for Children with the song "Room with Toys".

In November 2008, she performed her second song "Hope asks you" which was performed as a video clip. This song and its video clip had an extraordinary success in the Albanian Music market. In March 2009, she performed her third song, but this time in collaboration with her sister Greta Koci. The song is titled "Ne Bejme Dem" and the video clip was completed on May 13, 2009 and was promoted on all Albanian music TV channels.

In November 2010, Eni Koçi & Capital T participate in Kënga Magjike with the song "Diva". Later with the famous rapper Noizy, Koçi publish the video clip "So Hot". With this song, Noizy & Eni Koçi participate in the Nights of the Albanian Clip in 2011.

Personal life
Koçi is currently engaged to the Montenegrin-Albanian singer Genc Prelvukaj and together they reside in Tirana. She is a longtime supporter of Sali Berisha and the Democratic Party of Albania.

Discography

Singles

As lead artist

References 

1996 births
Living people
21st-century Albanian women singers
People from Berat